The women's football tournament at the 2002 Asian Games was held from 2 October to 11 October 2002 in Busan, South Korea.

Squads

Results
All times are Korea Standard Time (UTC+09:00)

Goalscorers

Final standing

References

RSSSF

External links
Official website

Women